Goldberg Magazine was a Spanish-based bimonthly magazine devoted to early music and Baroque music.

History and profile
Goldberg Magazine was started in 1997. The magazine was initially published in bilingual English/Spanish and English/French versions. Starting September 2003, the magazine published three separate editions in English, French and Spanish and in 2004 it went from four to six issues per year.

Goldberg Magazine launched a website called GoldbergWeb.com -- "the early-music portal"—to diversify communication channels for lovers of early music.

On 21 November 2008 Goldberg Ediciones announced that it was suspending publication of the magazine due to financial difficulties. Then it folded on the same date. The website was also shut down.

See also 
 List of magazines in Spain
 Roger Tellart (1932–2013), French musicologist, occasional contributor to the magazine

References

1997 establishments in Spain
2008 disestablishments in Spain
Classical music magazines
Defunct magazines published in Spain
Magazines established in 1997
Magazines disestablished in 2008
Spanish-language magazines
Bi-monthly magazines